Saidpur Pilot High School is a semi-official secondary school in Saidpur, a city in Bangladesh. It is one of the oldest schools in the country. It was the only school in Saidpur when it was established in 1906. Mainly it was established at the end of 18th century by the British. It moved to a new (current) building in 1906.

This school mainly called as "Saidpur High School" (সৈয়দপুর উচ্চ বিদ্যালয়) and also previous name "Bangla High School" 
Designation : "Father School " "Thana School" of Saidpur city.
Syllabus- Bangla Medium according to Dinajpur Education Board. Before Established of Dinajpur Education Board the school was under Rajshahi Education Board.

History 
The school, in the center of Saidpur town, was established in 1906. It was set up by the government of British India for teaching English literature and science and named Saidpur High School. In the beginning, there was few students. From last time of 18th century, the school was running with only boys. In the 1906, the school academic building was expanded and more facilities were created to make it a full-fledged high school. The school is situated on 5 acre land in front of academic building the school has big play ground.

Facilities
The school has three academic buildings, an administrative building, and two hostels. There is a big field in the school arena and there's also a basketball court. Other facilities include mosque, workshop, auditorium, canteen, shaheed minar, and library. The school has a laboratories and a computer lab.

Achievements
Among schools under the Board of Intermediate and Secondary Education, Dinajpur, the school ranked first numerous times on Secondary School Certificate (SSC)in examination in British period.

External links
 School's web site

References
Saidpur's Famous School College links
Banner
info

Schools in Nilphamari District
High schools in Bangladesh
1906 establishments in India
Educational institutions established in 1906